Wanhöden is a village in the municipality of Wurster Nordseeküste in Lower Saxony.

The village was first mentioned in 1509, and in 2009, the village hosted a large celebration for its 500th birthday.

Since 2009, the music festival Deichbrand takes place at the airport near Wanhöden.

References

Cuxhaven (district)
Villages in Lower Saxony